Xu Huiqin (born 4 September 1993) is a Chinese athlete specialising in the pole vault. She has won several medals on continental level.

Her personal bests in the event are 4.70 metres outdoors (Jockgrim 2019) and 4.65 metres indoors (Lievin, 2022).

International competitions

References

1993 births
Living people
Chinese female pole vaulters
Athletes (track and field) at the 2010 Summer Youth Olympics
Athletes (track and field) at the 2014 Asian Games
Asian Games competitors for China
Athletes (track and field) at the 2020 Summer Olympics
Olympic athletes of China
20th-century Chinese women
21st-century Chinese women